Scrymgeour is a Scottish clan (Clan Scrymgeour) and may refer to:

Alexander Scrymgeour, 12th Earl of Dundee (born 1949), Scottish nobleman
David Scrymgeour, Canadian entrepreneur
Edwin Scrymgeour (1866–1947), Member of Parliament (MP) for Dundee, Scotland
Henry Scrymgeour-Wedderburn, 11th Earl of Dundee (1902–1983), Scottish nobleman and politician
Rufus Scrimgeour, character in the Harry Potter universe

Surnames of Scottish origin